Li are folk songs of the Chakesang tribe of Nagaland, India. Literally, Li means Folksong in the Chokri language spoken by the Chakhesang tribe of Nagaland. It often takes the place of conversation and is known to beautifully communicate feelings, ideas and engage people in a circle of warmth and friendship.

References

Indian folk songs
Culture of Nagaland